The list of Tulu films that are scheduled to be released in 2017.

Releases

January – June

July – December

See also
List of Tulu films of 2019
List of Tulu films of 2018
List of Tulu films of 2016
List of Tulu films of 2015
List of Tulu films of 2014
List of Released Tulu films
Tulu cinema
 Tulu Movie Actors
 Tulu Movie Actresses
Karnataka State Film Award for Best Regional film
RED FM Tulu Film Awards

References
News Related Tulu Film:

External links
 Mangaluru: Raghu Shetty to direct Tulu comedy film
 Mangaluru: Ambar Caterers Movie Review

Tulu
Tulu-language films
Tulu